Oncousoeciidae is a family of bryozoans belonging to the order Cyclostomatida.

Genera

Genera:
 Abyssoecia Grischenko, Gordon & Melnik, 2018
 Anguisia Jullien, 1882
 Axilosoecia Taylor & Brezina, 2018
 Filicisparsa 
 Filisparsa 
 Foliopora 
 Hemipustulopora 
 Leptopora 
 Microeciella 
 Oncousoecia 
 Paulella 
 Proboscina

References

Cyclostomatida